USS Hyacinth may refer to the following ships of the United States Navy:

 , was a tugboat used by the US Army, transferred to the US Navy on 30 September 1862 and sold 17 August 1865
 , was a lighthouse tender launched in July 1902, transferred to the US Navy in April 1917 and returned to the Department of Commerce in July 1919

United States Navy ship names